Attil is a Palestinian town in the Tulkarm Governorate in the eastern West Bank,  northeast of Tulkarm. Attil is the connection point between the other villages and Tulkarm. It is bordered by Illar to the east; Baqa ash-Sharqiyya to the north; The Green Line to the west; and Deir al-Ghusun to the south. Mountains surrounding the town include the Nabhan, Aboora, Asad, and Shehadeh mountains.

History
Attil is an ancient village site on a hill at the edge of the plains. 
Pottery remain have been found here from  Middle Bronze Age II, Iron Age I and IA II, Persian, Hellenistic, early and late Roman, Byzantine, early Muslim and the Middle Ages have been found here.  Fragmentary mosaic floors and column shafts from a church have been found, together with cisterns dug into the rock, as well as caves.

In 1179, it was mentioned in Crusader sources as Azatil. In March 1265, when Sultan Baibars awarded his officers lands, he gave Attil “To the Atabek Faris al-Din Uqtay al-Salihi“.

Ottoman era
Attil, like the rest of Palestine, was incorporated into the Ottoman Empire in 1517, and in the census of 1596 it was a part of the nahiya ("subdistrict") of Jabal Sami which was under the administration of the liwa ("district") of  Nablus. The village had a population of 59 households, all Muslim, and paid taxes on wheat, barley, summer crops, olive trees, occasional revenues, beehives and/or goats, and an olive oil press, or press for grape syrup; a total of 14,872 akçe.

In 1838 it was noted as a village, 'Attil,  in the western Esh-Sha'rawiyeh administrative region, north of Nablus.

In the late Ottoman period, in 1852, the American scholar Edward Robinson described passing by the villages of Zeita and Jatt on the way to 'Attil. Of 'Attil itself, he writes that it was "a considerable village," located on a hill with plains to the north and south. He further noted: ”It appears, that the land in the district of Nabulus including the plains, is generally freehold; and the taxes are mainly paid in the form of a poll tax.”

In 1863, the French explorer Victor Guérin passed by and noted that the village was also called Deir Attil.

In 1882 the PEF's Survey of Western Palestine described the village as being of considerable size, situated on a hill on the edge of the plain, and surrounded by a small olive-grove, and supplied by cisterns.

British Mandate era
In the 1922 census of Palestine conducted by the British Mandate authorities, Attil had a population of 1,656, all Muslims. At the time of the 1931 census of Palestine, Attil, together with Jalama, Al-Manshiyya and Zalafa  had a total of 2207 persons, all Muslim except 1 Druze, living in 473 houses.

In the 1945 statistics the population of Attil was 2,650, all Muslims, who owned 7,337 dunams of land  according to an official land and population survey. 4,011 dunams were plantations and irrigable land, 2,527 used for cereals, while 86 dunams were built-up (urban) land.

Jordanian era
In the wake of the 1948 Arab–Israeli War, and after the 1949 Armistice Agreements, Attil came under Jordanian rule. It was annexed by Jordan in 1950.

In 1961, the population was  4,087.

Post-1967
Since the Six-Day War in 1967, Attil has been under Israeli occupation.

Population
Attil had a population of 9,038 in the 2007 census by the Palestinian Central Bureau of Statistics. The majority of its people are expatriates living in Jordan, various states in the Persian Gulf, the United States, Europe, and other parts of the world.

References

Bibliography

External links
Welcome To 'Attil
 Attil, Welcome to Palestine
Survey of Western Palestine, Map 11:    IAA, Wikimedia commons 

Towns in the West Bank
Municipalities of the State of Palestine